Paralopostega maculata is a moth of the family Opostegidae. It was first described by Lord Walsingham in 1907. It is endemic to the Hawaiian islands of Oahu and Molokai.

The larvae feed on Melicope oblongifolia and Melicope rotundifolia. They mine the leaves of their host plant. The mine is a close spiral produced outwardly from the center where the egg is laid on the upper surface of the leaf. The spiral may turn to the right or to the left. Just before issuing, the larva tunnels a short distance from the spiral.

External links
Generic Revision of the Opostegidae, with a Synoptic Catalog of the World's Species (Lepidoptera: Nepticuloidea)

Opostegidae
Endemic moths of Hawaii
Biota of Oahu
Biota of Molokai
Moths described in 1907